Robert "Cap" Raeder (born October 8, 1953) is an American former ice hockey goaltender and coach.

Raeder briefly played in the WHA for the New England Whalers in 1975–77 after starring for the University of New Hampshire men's ice hockey team in the early 1970s. His best year as a professional was in 1976 when he had the lowest goals against average of all goaltenders in the WHA playoffs. Based on the strength of that performance, he was later selected to the United States team at the inaugural 1976 Canada Cup. He later served as an interim head coach of the San Jose Sharks for one game in 2002, before taking a scouting position with the Sharks. In 2008, Raeder was hired as an assistant coach for the Tampa Bay Lightning.  In August 2010, Raeder retired, and now runs camps and clinics. Raeder is the analyst for Westwood One's coverage of the Frozen Four.

Awards and honors

Head coaching record

References

External links

Cap Raeder's profile at hockeydraftcentral.com

1953 births
AHCA Division I men's ice hockey All-Americans
American ice hockey coaches
American men's ice hockey goaltenders
Boston Bruins coaches
Ice hockey coaches from Massachusetts
Living people
Los Angeles Kings coaches
Montreal Canadiens draft picks
New England Whalers draft picks
New England Whalers players
New Hampshire Wildcats men's ice hockey players
Philadelphia Firebirds (AHL) players
Rhode Island Reds players
Sportspeople from Needham, Massachusetts
San Jose Sharks coaches
San Jose Sharks scouts
Tampa Bay Lightning coaches
Ice hockey players from Massachusetts